Karisakattu Poove is a 2000 Tamil-language drama film directed by Kasthuri Raja. The film stars Napoleon, Vineeth, Khushbu Sundar and Ravali. It was released on 23 June 2000.

Plot
The young man Pounrasu has a brother Kottaisaamy and a sister. Pounrasu is secretly in love with his sister's daughter Nagamani. Pounrasu then returns to his native village after studying in the city and he still loves her.

Nagamani's father fixes up Nagamani's marriage with a rowdy for money but her mother wants her brother Pounrasu to marry Nagamani. Finally, Kottaisaamy gets engaged with Nagamani and Pounrasu is unable to speak up against his brother.

Kottaisaamy's family and his uncle's family are in a feud for several years only because Kottaisaamy sends his uncle in jail. Kottaisaamy and Nagamani get ready for the wedding. Meanwhile, Sankarapandian, his uncle, manages to provide a wrong message to Kottaisaamy that Aandal's marriage was a forced marriage. Kottaisaamy immediately cancels Aandal's marriage and Kottaisaamy is forced to marry Aandal. Nagamani feels betrayed and cannot forget her beloved Kottaisaamy.

Kottaisaamy and Aandal could not live happily and they are in conflicts all the time. One day, Aandal discovers that Pounrasu and his uncle were, in fact, the culprits who forced Kottaisaamy to marry her. They managed to cancel her marriage because Pounrasu wanted to marry Nagamani. Aandal eventually promises Pounrasu to put together Nagamani and him. Meantime, his uncle kills Aandal.

The rest of the story is about what happens to Pounrasu and Nagamani.

Cast

Napoleon as Kottaisaamy
Vineeth as Pounrasu
Khushbu Sundar as Aandal 
Ravali as Nagamani
Vivek as Veeramani
Senthil as Chinnayya
Manivannan as Nagamani's father
Kovai Sarala as Nagamani's mother
Manorama
Vadivukkarasi
Dhamu
Nambirajan as Sankarapandian
Karikalan
Kumarasesan

Production
The film was initially titled as Eera Kaathu, before the film had a change of name. Devayani's refusal to be a part of the project meant that Ravali was signed.

Soundtrack

The film score and the soundtrack were composed by Ilaiyaraaja. The soundtrack, released in 2000, features 7 tracks with lyrics written by Kasthuri Raja.

References

External links

2000 films
Films scored by Ilaiyaraaja
2000s Tamil-language films
Films directed by Kasthuri Raja